Ryan William Stirk (born 25 September 2000) is a professional footballer who plays as a midfielder for National League club Bromley, on loan from  club Birmingham City. He spent the 2021–22 season on loan to Mansfield Town of League Two. He was born in England, and has represented Wales at levels up to under-21.

Club career
Stirk was born in Birmingham, and raised in Tamworth, Staffordshire, where he attended Landau Forte Academy. His parents were both keen on football and he has two older brothers. He joined Birmingham City F.C.'s Academy in 2010, went on a pre-season tour with the under-18s while still a 14-year-old schoolboy, took up a scholarship in July 2017, and signed his first professional contract, of three years with the option for a fourth, on his 17th birthday. He was a member of the club's under-18 team that reached the semifinal of the 2017–18 FA Youth Cup, performing well against a  strong Chelsea side, and became a regular in Birmingham's under-23 team in 2018–19.

When head coach Pep Clotet fielded an inexperienced team for the visit to Portsmouth in the 2019–20 EFL Cup first round, in which several youngsters made their senior debuts, Stirk was an unused substitute. The club took up their one-year option on his contract, and when the Championship season resumed after its suspension because of the COVID-19 pandemic, he was named on the nine-man bench for six of Birmingham's remaining nine matches under the temporary rules, but remained unused.

Once relegation was safely avoided at the end of the 2020–21 season, Birmingham manager Lee Bowyer stated that he intended to use the two remaining matches to assess fringe members of the squad. Described by the Birmingham Mail as a "diminutive but neat defensive midfielder who reads the game well and breaks up play before inviting team-mates into the play", Stirk made his first-team debut in a much-changed starting eleven for the Championship match at home to Cardiff City on 1 May 2021, played the whole of the 4–0 defeat, and kept his place for the last fixture of the season. In June, Stirk extended his contract for a further year with an option for a second.

Stirk signed for League Two club Mansfield Town on 27 July 2021, on loan for the 2021–22 season. He joined up with former Birmingham U23 team-mate Ryan Burke, who joined Mansfield earlier in the month after being released by Birmingham. He made his debut on the opening day of the season, as a stoppage-time replacement for George Maris in a 2–1 win at home to Bristol Rovers, and came close to opening the scoring with a "low first-time shot ... through a crowd of players" in the EFL Cup first-round tie at home to Championship opponents Preston North End before the visitors went on to win 3–0. In mid-September he damaged ankle ligaments and was out for six weeks, but returned to score his first senior goal and secure a 2–1 win away to Stevenage on 13 November. He finished the season with 36 appearances in all competitions, helping Mansfield reach the play-off final but was an unused substitute as they failed to gain promotion.

He made a couple of appearances for Birmingham in August 2022, before joining National League club Bromley on 16 February 2023 on loan until the end of the season.

International career
Stirk was born in England, and qualifies for Wales via his maternal grandmother. He was an unused substitute for Wales U16 while still a 13-year-old, made his under-17 debut at 15, and went on to play at under-19 and under-21 levels.

Career statistics

References

2000 births
Living people
Footballers from Birmingham, West Midlands
Sportspeople from Tamworth, Staffordshire
Welsh footballers
Wales youth international footballers
Wales under-21 international footballers
English footballers
English people of Welsh descent
Association football midfielders
Birmingham City F.C. players
Mansfield Town F.C. players
Bromley F.C. players
English Football League players